Fritos is an American brand of corn chips and dipping sauces that was created in 1932 by Charles Elmer Doolin and has been produced since 1961 by the Frito-Lay division of PepsiCo. Fritos are made by deep-frying extruded whole cornmeal, unlike the similar tortilla chips, which are made from cornmeal and use the nixtamalization process (known as masa). It is one of two brands representing Frito-Lay along with Lay's.

Origins

Frito means "fried" in Spanish.

According to the Handbook of Texas, published by the Texas State Historical Association:

The Frito Company was born in 1932 at the height of the Great Depression. The family of Charles Elmer (C. E.) Doolin (1903–1959) owned the Highland Park Confectionary in San Antonio, and Doolin, twenty-eight at the time, wanted to add a salty snack to their repertoire. He responded to an ad in the San Antonio Express. The ad, placed by Gustavo Olguin, listed for sale an original recipe for fried corn chips along with an adapted potato ricer and nineteen retail accounts. Doolin bought the small business venture for $100, and began to manufacture the chips in his mother’s kitchen with the help of his father, Charles Bernard Doolin; mother, Daisy Dean Stephenson Doolin; and brother, Earl Doolin. These four founders made up the first board of directors, with Charles Bernard Doolin serving as the first chairman.

The Doolin family began selling Fritos in 1932 under the name of the Frito Corporation, located first in their garage; they soon bought the house next door to expand their operation.  In 1933–34, they opened plants in Dallas and Tulsa.  In 1936, Fritos were displayed at the Texas Centennial Exposition and the exhibit was moved to the 'Castle of Foods' during the 1938 State Fair of Texas.  By 1947, the company had plants in Los Angeles and Denver, and licensed franchises nationwide, including H. W. Lay and Company, which had an exclusive franchise to produce and sell Fritos in the Southeastern United States.  As its business expanded, the Frito Company also produced other items, including Cheetos (1948), chili, bean dip, tortilla chips, and other Mexican-inspired treats, along with potato chips, roasted peanuts, fried pork skins, and other snack-food products.

By 1955, the company owned more than fifty production plants, including ones in Hawaii and Venezuela, as well as a number of "Frito farms" across Texas, where Doolin grew corn and other crops for use in his products.  The Frito Company was one of the first to invest in Disneyland, and from the park's opening in 1955 had a Casa de Fritos Restaurant there.  In 1961, the Frito Company merged with H. W. Lay and Company to become Frito-Lay.  In 1965, Frito-Lay merged with the Pepsi-Cola Company to become PepsiCo, one of the world's largest producers of soft drinks and snack foods.

According to Smithsonian magazine, C. E. Doolin did not eat meat or salt and was a follower of fellow Texan Herbert M. Shelton, a naturopath who advocated raw foods and fasting as a cure for diseases.

Company mascots

From 1952 to 1967, Frito Kid was the company's official mascot, designed by Keitz & Herndon. The Frito Bandito was its mascot from 1967 until about 1971, and was discontinued due to complaints about the racist Bandito image. He was initially replaced by the Muncha Bunch, a group of cowboys, which then were replaced by W.C. Fritos, modeled after comedian W. C. Fields.

Varieties
 Adobados (in Mexico)
 Bar-B-Q Hoops (in Canada)
 Jalapeño Hoops (in Canada)
 BBQ (in Spain)
 Chili Cheese
 Chile and Lime (in Mexico)
 Chorizo and Chipotle (in Mexico)
 Chutney (in South Africa)
 Classic Ranch
 Flamin' Hot
 Flamin' Hot BBQ
 Lightly Salted (a version of the original flavor Fritos that contain 50% less sodium)
 Original
 Peri Peri Waves (rippled chips – in South Africa)
 Pinch of Salt
 Salt and Lime (in Mexico)
 Scoops! (wider, cupped chips intended for dipping like for a chips and dip)
 Spicy Jalapeño (Only available as Scoops!)
 Sweet Chilli (in South Africa)
 Sweet Chilli Twists (fusilli-shaped chips – in South Africa)
 Tomato Sauce (in South Africa)
 Tomato Ribbons (similar shape to regular Fritos – in South Africa)

Flavor twists
A spiral-shaped variation of Fritos chips, currently only available in the United States.

 Cheddar Ranch (Available only in Munchies Totally Ranch snack mix)
 Honey BBQ

Dipping sauces
 Bean Dip
 Hot Bean Dip
 Jalapeño Cheddar Cheese Dip
 Mild Cheddar Cheese Dip

Discontinued variations
 King Size
 Fritos Lite
 Fritos Tabasco
 Fritos Racerz (late 1990s), the Fritos material formed into a more crunchy race car shape were sold for a short while before the introduction of Twists. They were marketed by Jeff Gordon.
 Limited Edition Wild 'n Mild Ranch (Limited re-release of discontinued flavor – late 2012)
 Nacho Cheese (late 1980s–early 1990s)
 Wild 'n Mild Ranch (1986–late 1990s)
 Cheddar Ranch Twists (late 1990s–early 2000s)
 Jalapeño Cheddar Twists (late 1990s–early 2000s)
 Texas Grill, a thicker version of the original with "grill strips" on the chips. The honey barbecue flavor transitioned over to the twists.
 McGraw's Spicy Jalapeño (limited edition; 2008, 2009)
 Ballpark Nacho (limited edition; 2010)
 Tapatio Flavor Twists
 Tex-Mex Flavor Twists
 Tangy Roasted Corn
 Mayonnaise flavor (late 1980s early 1990s)
 Mustard flavor

See also
 Frito pie

References

External links

 
Frito Kid and Deeee-licious Fritos!

Brand name snack foods
Frito-Lay brands
Products introduced in 1932